Melanie Kroupa Books was an imprint at:
Orchard Books (1992-1996)
DK Ink (1996-2000)
Farrar, Straus and Giroux Books for Young Readers (2000-2008)